{{Infobox artist
| name = Mario Mafai
| image = Mario Antonietta Mafai.jpg
| imagesize = 
| caption = Mario Mafai with is wife Antonietta (1935)
| birth_name = 
| birth_date =  
| birth_place = Rome, Italy
| death_date =   
| death_place = Rome, Italy
| nationality = Italian
| field = Painting
| training = 
| movement = Scuola romana
| works        = Demolizioni di Via Giulia (Demolitions in Via Giulia), 1928Paesaggio romano (Roman landscape), 1929
Demolizioni dell'Augusteo, 1936
Gli scaricatori di carbone (The colliers), 1950
| patrons = Alberto Della Ragione
Roberto Longhi
| awards = 
}}
Mario Mafai (12 February 1902 – 31 March 1965) was an Italian painter. With his wife Antonietta Raphaël he founded the modern art movement called the Scuola Romana, or Roman school.

 Biography 
Mafai left school very early, preferring to attend, with Scipione, the Scuola Libera del Nudo, or free school of the nude, of the Accademia di Belle Arti di Roma. His influences in those years were Roman galleries and museums, and the Fine Arts Library at Palazzo Venezia.

He met painter and sculptor Antonietta Raphaël in 1925, and they married.  They had three daughters: Miriam (1926), a journalist, partner of Communist politician Giancarlo Pajetta; Simona (1928) member of the Italian Senate and author; and Giulia (1930), a scenographer and costume designer.

In 1927 Mafai exhibited for the first time, with a show of studies and maquettes organised by the Associazione Artistica Nazionale in Via Margutta. In 1928 he had a second exhibition, at the XCIV Mostra degli Amatori e Cultori di Belle Arti, as well as a collective with Scipione and other painters, at the Young Painters Convention of Palazzo Doria in 1929.

In November 1927, Mafai and Raphaël moved to 325 via Cavour in Rome, and made a studio there. Within a short time, it became a meeting point for writers such as Enrico Falqui, Giuseppe Ungaretti, Libero de Libero and Leonardo Sinisgalli, as well as the young artists Scipione and Renato Marino Mazzacurati.

 See also 
Expressionism

References

 Bibliography 
F. N. Arnoldi, Storia dell'Arte, vol. III, Milan 1989I Mafai - Vite parallele, catalogue edited by M. Fagiolo, with biography by di F. R. Morelli
Enzo Siciliano, Il risveglio della bionda sirena. Raphaël e Mafai. Storia di un amore coniugale, Mondadori, Milan 2005
Fabrizio D'Amico, Marco Goldin, Casa Mafai : da via Cavour a Parigi : 1925-193, Linea d'ombra, 2004Mario Mafai, 1902-1965: una calma febbre di colori, Skira, 2004Io non sono un altro - l'arte di Mario Mafai (I Am Not the Other - The Art of Mario Mafai), DVD, Studio Angeletti & Scuola Romana Archive, 2005, directed by Giorgio Cappozzo

 External links 

 Mafai's works online, on Artcyclopedia.com. Accessed 26 May 2011
 Mario Mafai, on Artfact.com. Accessed 26 May 2011
 Archive of the Scuola Romana at Villa Torlonia
 Archivio Contemporaneo "Alessandro Bonsanti" - The Mario Mafai-Antonietta Raphaël Fund
 Mario Mafai and the Scuola romana
 The Quadriennale di Roma
 History of the Biennale di Venezia
 Two Exhibitions on Mafai in Rome and Brescia in 2005
 Archivio Contemporaneo "Alessandro Bonsanti" - Mario Mafai Fund
 Mafai Gallery, selected work on Settemuse.it'', with biography. Accessed 26 May 2011

1902 births
1965 deaths
20th-century Italian painters
Italian male painters
Italian anti-fascists
20th-century Italian sculptors
20th-century Italian male artists
Italian male sculptors